Monroe Township is one of thirteen townships in Washington County, Indiana, United States. As of the 2010 census, its population was 558 and it contained 320 housing units.

Geography

Unincorporated towns
 Kossuth at 
 Millport
 Plattsburg at 
(This list is based on USGS data and may include former settlements.)

Adjacent townships
 Driftwood Township, Jackson County (north)
 Grassy Fork Township, Jackson County (northeast)
 Gibson Township (east)
 Washington Township (south)
 Jefferson Township (west)

Cemeteries
The township contains these five cemeteries: Collett, Gater, Peugh, Ridlen and Weston.

School districts
 Salem Community Schools

Political districts
 Indiana's 9th congressional district
 State House District 73
 State Senate District 44

References
 United States Census Bureau 2007 TIGER/Line Shapefiles
 United States Board on Geographic Names (GNIS)
 IndianaMap

External links
 Indiana Township Association
 United Township Association of Indiana

Townships in Washington County, Indiana
Townships in Indiana